House of Prayer Episcopal Church and Rectory is a historic site at Broad and State Streets in Newark, Essex County, New Jersey, United States. The house was built in prior to 1725 (c. 1710) and the church in 1849 and they were added to the National Register of Historic Places in 1972.

The rectory was the home of Hannibal Goodwin, priest and inventor. Known as the Plume House, the building is considered one of the most endangered landmarks in the state.

The parish was founded in 1849 and held its first services in the rectory on November 7. A few days later, construction began on the Gothic Revival church building, designed by Frank Wills, which was consecrated a year later. A parish hall was added in several phases later in the 19th century.

See also 
 National Register of Historic Places listings in Essex County, New Jersey
 List of the oldest buildings in New Jersey

References

Episcopal church buildings in New Jersey
Churches on the National Register of Historic Places in New Jersey
Gothic Revival church buildings in New Jersey
Churches in Newark, New Jersey
Stone houses in New Jersey
National Register of Historic Places in Newark, New Jersey
New Jersey Register of Historic Places